The North Carolina Cabinet is the group of unelected heads of the executive departments of the Government of North Carolina. It is separate and distinct from the North Carolina Council of State, the members of which are elected statewide, and which makes up the rest of the executive leadership of the government. All cabinet secretaries are appointed by the governor.

History
On June 26, 1972, North Carolina Governor Robert W. Scott created the "Executive Cabinet," an advisory body consisting of the members of the North Carolina Council of State, the appointed secretaries of the state's executive departments, and miscellaneous members appointed by the governor.

The Cabinet's size decreased by two on Jan. 1, 2012, when three Cabinet-level agencies, the North Carolina Department of Crime Control and Public Safety, the North Carolina Department of Correction and the North Carolina Department of Juvenile Justice and Delinquency Prevention, were merged to become the North Carolina Department of Public Safety.

The Cabinet then expanded by two secretaries in 2015, with the creation of two new Departments: Information Technology, and Military and Veterans Affairs. Then the Cabinet increased by one in 2022, with the creation of the new Department of Adult Correction.

Current members
The current cabinet includes the following positions:

The Governor also appoints senior staff who are not Cabinet "Secretaries," but hold posts with a similar rank as Cabinet officials:
 Chief of Staff: Kristi Jones
 Director of the Office of State Human Resources: Barbara Gibson
 Budget Director: Kristin Walker

Advice and consent
Just before Roy Cooper took office as governor in 2017, the North Carolina General Assembly, breaking with longstanding tradition, added a provision to state law that Cabinet appointments require the advice and consent of the North Carolina Senate. Cooper challenged that law in court and said none of his nominees would wait for a Senate confirmation hearing to assume their duties. He announced on Jan. 27, 2017, that all but two cabinet secretaries had been sworn in and had taken office. A three-judge panel issued a temporary restraining order on Feb. 7, 2017, preventing the Senate from taking action to hold confirmation hearings, pending the outcome of the case challenging the constitutionality of the law. The panel later rescinded the order, but Cooper said he would hold off on submitting nominees to the Senate until after the trial could be held. After further court proceedings, the Senate issued a subpoena to Larry Hall to attend his confirmation hearing for Secretary of Military and Veterans Affairs, and Hall complied. The Senate later voted unanimously to confirm Hall. The North Carolina Court of Appeals ruled against the Governor and upheld the constitutionality of the law providing for advice and consent in November 2017.

References

Works cited 
 

 
United States state cabinets
Governor of North Carolina